The 2000 Tashkent Open was a women's tennis tournament played on hard courts at the Tashkent Tennis Center in Tashkent, Uzbekistan that was part of the Tier IVa category of the 2000 WTA Tour. It was the second edition of the tournament and was held from 12 June through 18 June 2000. Unseeded Iroda Tulyaganova won the singles title and earned $22,000 first-prize money.

Finals

Singles
 Iroda Tulyaganova defeated  Francesca Schiavone, 6–3, 2–6, 6–3
It was Tulyaganova's first title of her career

Doubles
 Li Na /  Li Ting defeated  Iroda Tulyaganova /  Anna Zaporozhanova, 3–6, 6–2, 6–4

References

External links
 Official website
 ITF tournament edition details
 Tournament draws

Tashkent Open
Tashkent Open
Tashkent Open
Tashkent Open